Pyrgulopsis bryantwalkeri, the Cortez Hills pebblesnail, is a species of minute freshwater snail with an operculum, aquatic gastropod molluscs or micromolluscs in the family Hydrobiidae.

This species' natural habitat is springs.  It is endemic to a spring in the Cortez foot-hills, Elko County, Nevada, United States.

Description
Its differentiated from other Pyrgulopsis in that its penial filament has a very weak lobe and short filament with the penial ornament consisting of a weakly developed terminal gland.

References

Molluscs of the United States
bryantwalkeri
Gastropods described in 1994